"Love Again" is a song recorded by Canadian pop rock group Hedley for their forthcoming seventh studio album, Cageless. The song was written and produced by Jacob Hoggard, Brian Howes, and Jason "JVP" Van Poederooyen. It was released through Universal Music Canada on June 13, 2017 as the record's lead single. "Love Again" has reached a peak position of 50 on the Canadian Hot 100 chart.

Composition
"Love Again" is a romantic midtempo R&B song about giving love another chance. It was written by the group's lead singer Jacob Hoggard with frequent collaborators Brian Howes and Jason "JVP" Van Poederooyen. According to the digital sheet music published by Atlas Music Publishing, "Love Again" was composed in the key of C minor and set to an approximate tempo of 100 BPM. The song is the group's first release since the departure of their longtime drummer Chris Crippin.

Critical reception
Heather Young of Canadian Beats wrote that the song "has a distinct pop radio sound and is bound to become a summer smash."

Commercial performance
"Love Again" entered the Hot Canadian Digital Songs sales chart, dated July 1, 2017, at number 47 based on its first three days of availability. Following its first full week of consumption, the song debuted at number 60 on the Canadian Hot 100 chart dated July 8, 2017. It has since peaked at number 50 on the chart dated August 19, 2017. "Love Again" has also peaked at number 5 on the Canada AC airplay chart, 9 on the Canada CHR/Top 40 airplay chart, and 5 on the Canada Hot AC airplay chart, respectively.

Charts

Certifications

Release history

References

2017 songs
2017 singles
Hedley (band) songs
Universal Music Canada singles
Songs written by Jacob Hoggard
Songs written by Brian Howes